The W.E.B. DuBois School, located off U.S. Route 69 in Summit, Oklahoma, was built in 1925. It was listed on the National Register of Historic Places in 1984.

The exterior of its original portion is finished with random coursed native stone. A 1941 addition is faced with red brick, and a 1950s addition is built of concrete block. Its front, south facade has a round-arched entryway.

References

Schools in Oklahoma
National Register of Historic Places in Muskogee County, Oklahoma
Buildings and structures completed in 1925